The West Virginia University School of Dentistry is the dental school of West Virginia University. It is located in the United States city of Morgantown. The school opened its doors in 1957 and is the only dental school in West Virginia.

History 
West Virginia University School of Dentistry, a part of West Virginia University was established in 1957. The school has graduated over 1542 dentists and 599 dental hygienists.

Departments 
West Virginia University School of Dentistry includes following departments:
Dental Practice and Rural Health
Dental Research
Division of Dental Hygiene
Oral and Maxillofacial Surgery
Orthodontics
Periodontics
Prosthodontics
Restorative Dentistry
 Pediatric Dentistry

Accreditation 
West Virginia University School of Dentistry is currently accredited by ADA.

See also

American Student Dental Association

References 

Dental schools in West Virginia